The Social Committee of the Council of Ministers is an advisory body to the council of ministers of the Republic of Poland and the president of the Council of Ministers themselves, mostly reviewing social affairs within the framework of the 1st and 2nd cabinets of Mateusz Morawiecki. Instituted in 2017, the Committee was originally chaired by Beata Szydło, the previous prime minister and incumbent deputy prime minister. Piotr Gliński, the deputy prime minister and Minister of Culture and National Heritage, has been president of the Committee since June 24, 2019, following his predecessor's election to the European Parliament.

History
On December 8, 2017, Beata Szydło, the incumbent Prime Minister, submitted her resignation from the office to the president of Poland, simultaneously abolishing her cabinet. The renouncement was approved by the President. On the same day, Mateusz Morawiecki, Szydło's previous deputy, was designated Prime Minister, commissioned to complete the composition of his Council of Ministers. Beata Szydło entered the new the government, assuming the office of Deputy Prime Minister. On December 20, Morawiecki issued a regulation which established the Social Committee and promoted Szydło to the position of presiding officer.

In the 2019 European Parliamentary Election, the United Right put up Szydło's candidacy. The deputy prime minister obtained a seat, which resulted in the relinquishment of her ministerial offices on June 3. On June 18, the Prime Minister implemented an amendment to the regulation from 2017, devolving the position of President of the Social Committee to Piotr Gliński, his deputy. The regulation went into effect on June 24.

Upon the 2019 Polish parliamentary election, the Social Committee of the Council of Ministers remained undissolved as the Second Cabinet of Mateusz Morawiecki was being formed. Another amendment introduced to the Prime Minister's regulation did not rescind Piotr Gliński's presidency over the advisory body, either.

Purposes and composition
The main purpose of the Social Committee of the Council of Ministers is initiation, supervision, and coordination of any governmental projects supposed to improve the situation of Polish families prior to their submission to the Sejm. The Prime Minister's regulation also obligates the body to conduct analyses and assessments as regards the above, as well as execute any other missions commissioned by the Head of Government.

The composition of the Committee involves particular ministries and is specified by the Prime Minister's regulation, numerously updated over the past three years. In case of a Minister's inability to participate in a meeting, a Secretary of State can appear on their behalf. Meetings are presided by the President, appointed and recalled by the Prime Minister. If present, the Prime Minister chairs the sitting themselves.

List of presidents
 Beata Szydło (December 20, 2017 – June 3, 2019)
 Piotr Gliński (since June 24, 2019)

References

History of Poland (1989–present)
2019 establishments in Poland
Government of Poland